This is a list of Missouri Tigers football players in the NFL Draft.

Key

Selections

References

Missouri

Missouri Tigers NFL Draft